Saccharopolyspora deserti is a halotolerant bacterium from the genus of Saccharopolyspora which has been isolated from sand from Saudi Arabia.

References

Pseudonocardineae
Bacteria described in 2018